Rivalries in the KHL come in many categories. As the league is still young, many of the rivalries have carried over from the days of the Russian Superleague, while others are new and may disappear. Some are based on geography, while others are based on team names or organization that these teams belonged to back in the Soviet Union. Not all teams have pronounced rivalries that don't change with each season - this article attempts to chronicle only those that last for multiple years.

In the European tradition, rivalries in Russia are referred to as "Derbies".

Geographic rivalries

Capital City Derbies
 HC CSKA Moscow vs. HC Spartak Moscow
 HC Spartak Moscow vs. HC Dynamo Moscow
 HC Dynamo Moscow vs. HC CSKA Moscow

Every year, sports news outlets even calculate who the Moscow Champion is, based on games just between these three teams. As of the second season of the KHL (2009–10), all the Moscow teams are in one Conference, making rivalry matches more common. Due to hockey being less popular than association football and other sports in Moscow, teams based there usually suffer in attendance. Capital city derbies, however, are always attended far better than other games.

Moscow Oblast Derbies
 Atlant Moscow Oblast vs. Vityaz Chekhov (Defunct)
 Atlant Moscow Oblast vs. HC MVD (Defunct)
 Khimik Voskresensk vs. HC MVD (Defunct)
 Vityaz Chekhov vs. HC MVD (Defunct)
 Vityaz Chekhov vs. Khimik Voskresensk (Defunct)

Two Capitals Derbies
A continuation of the general rivalry between Saint Petersburg and Moscow, this rivalry encompasses SKA against any of the Moscow teams, although not the teams in the Moscow Oblast. The most tense rivalry is between SKA and CSKA, which called The Army Derby. 
 SKA Saint Petersburg vs. HC Spartak Moscow
 SKA Saint Petersburg vs. HC Dynamo Moscow
 SKA Saint Petersburg vs. HC CSKA Moscow

Tatarstan Derby
 Ak Bars Kazan vs. Neftekhimik Nizhnekamsk
Not as seriously regarded by Ak Bars as by Neftekhimik, this rivalry nonetheless is significant in that Ak Bars has been known to poach players and coaches (Vladimir Krikunov was poached just before the 2011–12 KHL season following Zinetula Bilyaletdinov's hiring by the Russia men's national ice hockey team). Ak Bars Kazan is regarded as the 'older brother' of Tatarstan hockey, and the rivalry reflect a sibling mentality.

Ural Derbies
 Traktor Chelyabinsk vs. Metallurg Magnitogorsk
 Traktor Chelyabinsk vs. Avtomobilist Yekaterinburg
 Avtomobilist Yekaterinburg vs. Metallurg Magnitogorsk

Siberian Derbies
 Sibir Novosibirsk vs. Avangard Omsk
 Sibir Novosibirsk vs. Metallurg Novokuznetsk (Defunct)
 Avangard Omsk vs. Metallurg Novokuznetsk (Defunct)

Volga Derbies
 Lokomotiv Yaroslavl vs. Torpedo Nizhny Novgorod
 Torpedo Nizhny Novgorod vs. Ak Bars Kazan
 HC Lada Togliatti vs. Lokomotiv Yaroslavl (Defunct)
 HC Lada Togliatti vs. Ak Bars Kazan (Defunct)
 HC Lada Togliatti vs. Torpedo Nizhny Novgorod (Defunct)
 Ak Bars Kazan vs. Lokomotiv Yaroslavl

Czechoslovak Derby
 HC Lev Praha vs. Slovan Bratislava (Defunct)
The rivalry was natural from the very beginning due to the Czech Republic–Slovakia ice hockey rivalry and the two teams being the only representatives of their countries in the league. It got even intensified when in their first game HC Lev's Zdeno Chára body-checked Slovan's team captain Miroslav Šatan after which Šatan had been out of play until the end of the season. The fairness of this hit was the center of many discussions.

Far Eastern Derby
 Amur Khabarovsk vs. Admiral Vladivostok

Organizational rivalries

Army Derby
 HC CSKA Moscow vs. SKA Saint Petersburg
Both teams in Soviet times belonged to the Army organization - (C)SKA stands for (Central'niy) Sportivniy Klub Armii, (Central) Sports Club of the Army.

Dinamo Derbies
Not as prominent as the Army rivalry, sometimes games between the Dynamo Sports Club teams are referred to as a rivalry. Fans also sometimes treat the inter-Dynamo games with special attention. However unlike the other two, the new incarnation of Dinamo Riga does not directly come from the organization but rather only took the identity of the meanwhile abolished Soviet era incarnation of Dinamo Riga.
 Dinamo Riga vs. HC Dinamo Minsk
 HC Dinamo Minsk vs. HC Dynamo Moscow
 HC Dynamo Moscow vs. Dinamo Riga
Dynamo Moscow and Dinamo Riga have met in three consecutive years of the KHL playoffs (if the series against HC MVD is included), with Moscow winning two series so far, and Riga only one.

Khimik Derby (Defunct, also known as Yellow-Blue derby)
 Khimik Voskresensk vs. Atlant Moscow Oblast (Defunct)
Before relocating to Mytishchi, Atlant used to be known as Khimik and play in Voskresensk. After relocation, Voskresensk fielded a new team called Khimik in the Russian minor leagues. In the first season of the KHL, Khimik Voskresensk was invited to join the Russian Major League after it won the league and original invitee Avtomobilist Yekaterinburg could not fulfill its financial obligations. Not active since Khimik dropped out of the league after the first season due to financial issues (although it theoretically still holds KHL membership and could rejoin if finances allow). Most fans consider Khimik Voskresensk the true heir of Voskresensk hockey, and this rivalry was regarded as both a Moscow Oblast Derby, and an Organizational Derby.

Divisional rivalries
Permanent divisions were first introduced to the KHL organizational structure in the second season, 2009-2010 (in the first season, the divisions were based on performance rather than geography, and were designed to be fluid. Starting in the second season, divisions became geographic in order to cut travel costs). As yet, notable rivalries due only to divisions have not really developed, although sports reporters always pay higher attention to games between the top two teams.

 Severstal Cherepovets vs. Lokomotiv Yaroslavl
 Amur Khabarovsk vs. Avangard Omsk
 Amur Khabarovsk vs. Sibir Novosibirsk
 Amur Khabarovsk vs. Metallurg Novokuznetsk (Defunct)
 Dinamo Riga vs. SKA Saint Petersburg

Play-off rivalries
 Avangard Omsk vs. Metallurg Magnitogorsk
Two of the best teams from the Russian Superleague era, these two teams are still considered "Grands" and their matches are highlighted by the news when they occur.

 Salavat Yulaev Ufa vs. Ak Bars Kazan
 Severstal Cherepovets vs. Atlant Moscow Oblast (Defunct)
 SKA Saint Petersburg vs. Atlant Moscow Oblast (Defunct)
 Ak Bars Kazan vs. Traktor Chelyabinsk
 Ak Bars Kazan vs. Metallurg Magnitogorsk
 Salavat Yulaev Ufa vs. Metallurg Magnitogorsk
 Lokomotiv Yaroslavl vs. Atlant Moscow Oblast (Defunct)

Big Green Derby
 Ak Bars Kazan vs. Salavat Yulaev Ufa
Also can be referred to as the Derby of Champions, these are the first two teams to have won the Gagarin Cup. Both teams have green uniforms, are from autonomous republics, and have NHL-caliber players, making the games always a much watched and commented on affair.

Cat Derby
 Barys Nur-Sultan vs. Ak Bars Kazan
The name of the rivalry comes from the names of the team - both refer to snow leopards. Ak Bars has played Barys in the first playoff round of the first three KHL seasons, and defeated them every year without losing a game.

Other rivalries

 SKA Saint Petersburg vs. Severstal Cherepovets
 Vityaz Chekhov vs. HC Dinamo Minsk
 Vityaz Chekhov vs. Avangard Omsk

References 

Kontinental Hockey League
Ice hockey rivalries